The 1975 Southern Cross Rally, officially the Total Oil Southern Cross International Rally was the tenth running of the Southern Cross Rally. The rally took place between the 8th and the 12th of October 1975. The event covered 3,367 kilometres from Sydney to Port Macquarie.  It was won by Andrew Cowan and Fred Gocentas, driving a Mitsubishi Lancer GSR.

Results

References

Rally competitions in Australia
Southern Cross Rally